Waimea Plain(s) could refer to the following areas in New Zealand:
Waimea Plain (Southland), an area in Southland
Waimea Plains (Tasman), an area in Tasman